"Lalalay" (stylized in all caps) is a song recorded by South Korean singer Sunmi, released on August 27, 2019, by Makeus Entertainment as a single. Sunmi wrote and co-produced the song with Frants.

Background and composition 
The song was announced and confirmed by Sunmi on August 17, 2019 through a promotional poster on various social media accounts. "Lalalay" runs for two minutes and fifty-four seconds. It was written by Sunmi and produced by her and Frants. Tamar Herman of Billboard describes the song as a "Latin pop and dancehall elements with traditional Korean sounds, incorporating the traditional Korean horn instrument known as a taepyeongso."

Music video
The music video was directed by Choi Yongseok (Lumpens). It was uploaded on 1theK's channel and Sunmi's official channel on August 27, 2019. As of April 2021, the video has over 33 million views combined on both channels.

Credits and personnel
Credits adapted from Tidal.
 Sunmi – vocals, songwriting, composition
 Frants – composition, production

Accolades

Awards and nominations

Charts

Release history

See also
List of Kpop Hot 100 number ones

References

2019 singles
2019 songs
Sunmi songs
Korean-language songs
Billboard Korea K-Pop number-one singles
Music videos directed by Lumpens
Songs written by Sunmi